Oh, Mando! is a Philippine streaming television series starring Kokoy de Santos, Alex Diaz and Barbie Imperial. Directed by Eduardo Roy Jr. and produced by Dreamscape Entertainment together with Found Films. It premiered on iWantTFC on November 5, 2020.

Plot 
Charming but timid college student Mando, a typical hopeless romantic meets Barry, an out-and-proud basketball star who is practically a prince from a fairytale. The only thing spoiling Mando's happy ending is the fact that Barry already has a boyfriend. To move on, Mando goes out with liberated architecture student Krisha and the two become lovers. One fateful day, Barry walks back into Mando's life. Now, he needs to choose - will it be mind over heart or heart over mind?

Cast and characters

Main  
 Kokoy de Santos as Armando "Mando" Deputado Jr., a first year Mass Communication student who gets into a complicated situation when his romantic feelings to his schoolboy crush blossoms while he is in a relationship with his girlfriend.
 Alex Diaz as Barry Cruz, Mando's schoolboy crush and Krisha's brother
 Barbie Imperial as Krisha Cruz, Mando's girlfriend and Barry's sister

Supporting 
 Dominic Ochoa as Armando "Tatay Armando" Deputado Sr., Mando's father
 Andrea del Rosario as Sandra Deputado, Mando's mother
 Dionne Monsanto as Lucy, Sandra's girlfriend
 Joel Saracho as Mr. Siwa, St. Henry's theatre advisor
 Almira Muhlach as Pia, Barry and Krisha's mother
 Pontri Bernardo as Lino, Barry and Krisha's father
 Julian Roxas as Clark, Barry's boyfriend
 Sam Cafranca as Gabo, Tatay Armando's tenant
 Ronald del Rosario as Dado, Tatay Armando's friend
 Z Mejia as Kim Bash, Vince's Korean boyfriend and Clark's sidekick
 Ron Martin Angeles as St. Henry's varsity basketball player, Barry's teammate
 Vandave Paragas as St. Henry's varsity basketball player, Barry's teammate
 Miguel Villasis as St. Henry's varsity basketball player, Barry's teammate

Production 
Directing the web series is Eduardo Roy Jr. who was also the director of several Filipino independent films such as "Pamilya Ordinaryo", "Lola Igna", and "Fuccbois". It was teased around February 2020 but its production was hampered after four shooting days as an enhanced community quarantine was imposed due to the COVID-19 pandemic. Its production was later resumed in July when the quarantine restrictions were already eased.

Episodes

Soundtracks

See also 
 Gameboys
 Hello Stranger
 Gaya Sa Pelikula
 Ben X Jim
 Boys Lockdown
 The Boy Foretold by the Stars

References

External links 
 
 Oh, Mando! on iWantTFC

IWantTFC original programming
2020 web series debuts
Philippine LGBT-related web series
Television series by Dreamscape Entertainment Television